Darganata District   (formerly Birata District) is a district of Lebap Province in Turkmenistan. The administrative center of the district is the town of Birata.

References

Districts of Turkmenistan
Lebap Region